Tony Shearer (born Fred Anthony Shearer October 27, 1926, Colorado, d. May 2002) was an American Mayanism proponent and New Age author who wrote books contributing to the modern popularization of syncretic beliefs in which elements of Maya calendrics are highlighted in the supposed significance of dates in December 2012 A.D., as well as August 1987 A.D.

Shearer stated in the preface to his 1971 book that he withdrew from a promising career in conventional broadcast journalism in the 1960s in order to investigate the meaning of life, leading him to research and experience beliefs and practices of ancient and modern Mesoamericans. He then published a work titled "Quetzalcoatl: Lord of the Dawn" in June 1971. The work was republished with the text and illustrations unchanged in 1995, titled "Quetzalcoatl: Lord of the Dawn and the Tree of Life".

Books
Quetzalcoatl, Lord of the Dawn, published 1971, 1995
Beneath the Moon and Under the Sun: A Poetic Reappraisal of the Sacred Calendar and the Prophecies of Ancient Mexico, 1975
The Praying Flute: Song of the Earth Mother: A Bald Mountain Story (Children's Book) published 1975, 1988, 1991, 2004
The Story as Told, co-authored with Jalil Mahmoudi, Massood Mahmoudi
The Sacred Calendar of Quetzalcoatl, 1976
Spirit Song,1981.
Boy and Tree and Poetic Myth, 1993.

References

External links 

How did Tony Shearer calculate Harmonic Convergence?
Native American flute manufacturer pays tribute to "Lakota artist, storyteller, and author Tony Shearer."

New Age writers
1926 births
2002 deaths